Edward Lester (dates unknown) was an English first-class cricketer active 1929–31 who played for Middlesex.

Full name Edward Lester

Major teams Middlesex

Batting style Right-hand bat

Bowling style Right-arm medium

Batting and fielding averages

Bowling averages

Career statistics

References

English cricketers
Middlesex cricketers
Year of birth missing
Year of death missing